The bronze caco (Cacosternum nanum), or bronze dainty frog, is a species of frog in the family Pyxicephalidae found in South Africa, Eswatini, and possibly Lesotho and Mozambique.

Cacosternum nanum  is one of the most common frogs in its range. It occurs in a wide range of habitats, including fynbos heathland, savanna, shrubland, grassland, farmland, plantations, rural grassland, degraded forest, and urban areas. They aestivate below the surface or under logs and stones during dry periods, and may emerge in large numbers after heavy rain.

References

Cacosternum
Frogs of Africa
Vertebrates of Lesotho
Amphibians of Mozambique
Amphibians of South Africa
Taxa named by George Albert Boulenger
Amphibians described in 1887
Taxonomy articles created by Polbot